The 1961 Pittsburgh Steelers season was the franchise's 29th in the National Football League.

Regular season

Schedule

Game summaries

Week 1 (Sunday September 17, 1961): Dallas Cowboys 

at Cotton Bowl, Dallas, Texas

 Game time: 
 Game weather: 
 Game attendance: 23,500
 Referee: 
 TV announcers:

Scoring Drives:

 Dallas – Clarke 44 pass from LeBaron (Green kick)
 Pittsburgh – Johnson 1 run (Layne kick)
 Pittsburgh – Dial 44 pass from Layne (Layne kick)
 Dallas – FG Green 15
 Dallas – Howton 45 pass from LeBaron (Green kick)
 Pittsburgh – FG Michaels 12
 Pittsburgh – Sample 39 interception return (Layne kick)
 Dallas – Bieski 17 pass from Meredith (Green kick)
 Dallas – FG Green 27

Week 2 (Sunday September 24, 1961): New York Giants  

at Forbes Field, Pittsburgh, Pennsylvania

 Game time: 
 Game weather: 
 Game attendance: 35,587
 Referee: 
 TV announcers:

Scoring Drives:

 Pittsburgh – Johnson 1 run (Tracy kick)
 New York Giants – Shofner 16 pass from Conerly (Summerall kick)
 New York Giants – FG Summerall 19
 New York Giants – Morrison 5 pass from Tittle (Summerall kick)
 Pittsburgh – Dial 4 pass from Layne (Tracy kick)

Week 3 (Sunday October 1, 1961): Los Angeles Rams  

at Los Angeles Memorial Coliseum, Los Angeles
 Game time: 
 Game weather: 
 Game attendance: 40,070
 Referee: 
 TV announcers:

Scoring Drives:

 Los Angeles – Bratkowski 2 run (Villanueva kick)
 Pittsburgh – Dial 20 pass from Bukich (Layne kick)
 Pittsburgh – Johnson 5 run (Layne kick)
 Los Angeles – Phillips 15 pass from Ryan (Villanueva kick)
 Los Angeles – Matson 96 pass from Ryan (Villanueva kick)
 Los Angeles – FG Villanueva 15

Week 4 (Sunday October 8, 1961): Philadelphia Eagles  

at Franklin Field, Philadelphia

 Game time: 
 Game weather: 
 Game attendance: 60,671
 Referee: George Rennix
 TV announcers:

Scoring Drives:

 Pittsburgh – FG Michaels 23
 PIttsburgh – Bukich 1 run (Michaels kick)
 Philadelphia – Retzlaff 17 pass from Jurgensen (Walston kick)
 Philadelphia – Peaks 1 run (Walston kick)
 Pittsburgh – Dial 13 pass from Bukich (kick failed)
 Philadelphia – Retzlaff 2 pass from Jurgensen (Walston kick)

Week 5 (Sunday October 15, 1961): Washington Redskins  

at Forbes Field, Pittsburgh, Pennsylvania

 Game time: 
 Game weather: 
 Game attendance: 15,072
 Referee: 
 TV announcers:

Scoring Drives:

 Pittsburgh – Carpenter 8 pass from Bukich (Michaels kick)
 Pittsburgh – Dial 23 pass from Bukich (Michaels kick)
 Pittsburgh – FG Michaels 13
 Pittsburgh – FG Michaels 36

Week 6 (Sunday October 22, 1961): Cleveland Browns  

at Forbes Field, Pittsburgh, Pennsylvania

 Game time: 
 Game weather: 
 Game attendance: 29,266
 Referee: 
 TV announcers:

Scoring Drives:

 Cleveland – FG Groza 24
 Cleveland – Mitchell 6 run (Groza kick)
 Pittsburgh – Dial 12 pass from Bukich (Michaels kick)
 Pittsburgh – Tracy 1 run (Michaels kick)
 Cleveland – FG Groza 36
 Cleveland – Mitchell 9 run (Groza kick)
 Pittsburgh – Tracy 1 run (Michaels kick)
 Cleveland – Mitchell 18 run (Groza kick)
 Cleveland – FG Groza 12
 Pittsburgh – Dial 88 pass from Bukich (Michaels kick)

Week 7 (Sunday October 29, 1961): San Francisco 49ers  

at Forbes Field, Pittsburgh, Pennsylvania

 Game time: 
 Game weather: 
 Game attendance: 21,686
 Referee: 
 TV announcers:

Scoring Drives:

 Pittsburgh – Johnson 30 run (Michaels kick)
 Pittsburgh – Tracy 11 pass from Bukich (Michaels kick)
 Pittsburgh – FG Michaels 16
 San Francisco – Stickles 50 pass from Brodie (Davis kick)
 San Francisco – FG Davis 20
 Pittsburgh – FG Michaels 24

Week 8 (Sunday November 5, 1961): Cleveland Browns  

at Cleveland Municipal Stadium, Cleveland, Ohio

 Game time: 
 Game weather: 
 Game attendance: 62,723
 Referee: 
 TV announcers:

Scoring Drives:

 Cleveland – J. Brown 3 run
 Cleveland – FG Groza 27
 Pittsburgh – Bukich 1 run (Michaels kick)
 Pittsburgh – FG Michaels 10
 Cleveland – FG Groza 37
 Pittsburgh – Schnelker 26 pass from Bukich (Michaels kick)

Week 9 (Sunday November 12, 1961): Dallas Cowboys  

at Cotton Bowl, Dallas, Texas

 Game time: 
 Game weather: 
 Game attendance: 17,519
 Referee: 
 TV announcers:

Scoring Drives:

 Pittsburgh – Johnson 1 run (Michaels kick)
 Pittsburgh – FG Michaels 28
 Dallas – Perkins 11 run (Green kick)
 Pittsburgh – FG Michaels 19
 Pittsburgh – Dial 73 pass from Bukich (Michaels kick)
 Pittsburgh – Butler 71 interception (Michaels kick)
 Pittsburgh – Dial 15 pass from Bikich (Michaels kick)
 Pittsburgh – FG Michaels 47

Week 10 (Sunday November 19, 1961): New York Giants  

at Forbes Field, Pittsburgh, Pennsylvania

 Game time: 
 Game weather: 
 Game attendance: 62,592
 Referee: 
 TV announcers:

Scoring Drives:

 Pittsburgh – Dial 15 pass from Bukich (Michaels kick)
 New York Giants – Walton 9 pass from Tittle (Summerall kick)
 New York Giants – Gaiters 3 run (Summerall kick)
 New York Giants – Webster 23 pass from Tittle (Summerall kick)
 New York Giants – Rote 20 pass from Tittle (Summerall kick)
 New York Giants – Rote 9 pass from Gaiters (Summerall kick)
 Pittsburgh – Carpenter 13 pass from Hoak (Michaels kick)
 Pittsburgh – Dial 3 pass from Layne (Michaels kick)
 New York Giants – Webster 32 run (Summerall kick)

Week 11 (Sunday November 26, 1961): St. Louis Cardinals  

at Forbes Field, Pittsburgh, Pennsylvania

 Game time: 
 Game weather: 
 Game attendance: 17,090
 Referee: 
 TV announcers:

Scoring Drives:

 St. Louis – Norton 47 interception return (kick failed)
 St. Louis – Randle 3 pass from Etcheverry (Perry kick)
 Pittsburgh – FG Michaels 18
 Pittsburgh – FG Michaels 36
 Pittsburgh – Schnelker 11 pass from Layne (Michaels kick)
 Pittsburgh – Sample 55 punt return (Michaels kick)
 Pittsburgh – Johnson 2 run (Michaels kick)
 St. Louis – Crow 61 pass from Guglielmi (Conrad kick)
 St. Louis – Norton 37 interception return (Conrad kick)
 Pittsburgh – FG Michaels 18

Week 12 (Sunday December 3, 1961): Philadelphia Eagles  

at Forbes Field, Pittsburgh, Pennsylvania

 Game time: 
 Game weather: 
 Game attendance: 21,653
 Referee: 
 TV announcers:

Scoring Drives:

 Philadelphia – Walston 17 pass from Jurgensen (Walston kick)
 Philadelphia – Peaks 1 run (Walston kick)
 Pittsburgh – Carpenter 7 pass from Layne (Michaels kick)
 Pittsburgh – FG Michaels 37
 Philadelphia – Lucas 7 pass from Jurgensen (Walston kick)
 Philadelphia – Brown 66 punt return (Walston kick)
 Pittsburgh – Johnson 7 pass from Layne (Michaels kick)
 Pittsburgh – Schnelker 8 pass from Layne (Michaels kick)
 Philadelphia – Brown 42 run (Walston kick)

Week 13 (Sunday December 10, 1961): Washington Redskins  

at D.C. Stadium, Washington, D.C.

 Game time: 
 Game weather: 
 Game attendance: 21,134
 Referee: 
 TV announcers:

Scoring Drives:

 Pittsburgh – Mack 10 pass from Layne (Michaels kick)
 Washington – Dugan 9 pass from Snead (Aveni kick)
 Pittsburgh – FG Michaels 42
 Pittsburgh – Carpenter 40 pass from Layne (Michaels kick)
 Pittsburgh – Mack 6 pass from Layne (Michaels kick)
 Washington – Dugan 11 pass from Izo (Aveni kick)
 Pittsburgh – Dial 5 pass from Layne (kick failed)

Week 14 (Sunday December 17, 1961): St. Louis Cardinals  

at Busch Stadium, St. Louis, Missouri

 Game time: 
 Game weather: 
 Game attendance: 16,298
 Referee: 
 TV announcers:

Scoring Drives:

 St. Louis – Randle 3 pass from Etcheverry (Perry kick)
 St. Louis – Stacy 25 fumble run (kick failed)
 St. Louis – Crow 15 pass from Etcheverry (Perry kick)

Standings

References

Pittsburgh Steelers seasons
Pittsburgh Steelers
Pittsburgh Steel